Aavin is a State Government Cooperative under the ownership of Tamil Nadu Cooperative Milk Producers Federation Limited, Ministry of Cooperation, Government of Tamil Nadu and the trademark of Tamil Nadu Co-operative Milk Producers' Federation Limited. Aavin procures milk, processes it and sells milk and milk products to consumers.

The company produces a wide range of products, including milk, butter, yogurt, ice cream, ghee, milk shake, khoa, tea, coffee, and chocolate, among other goods.

History
The Dairy Development Department was established in Tamil Nadu in the year 1958 to oversee and regulate milk production and commercial distribution in the state. The Dairy Development Department took over control of the milk cooperatives. It was replaced by the Tamil Nadu Cooperative Milk Producers Federation Limited in the year 1981. On 1 February 1981, the commercial activities of the cooperative were handed over to Tamil Nadu Co-operative Milk Producers' Federation Limited which sold milk and milk products under the trademark "aavin". Tamil Nadu is one of the leading states in India in milk production with about 14.5 million liters per day and currently has 1 crore daily consumers.

'Aa' or 'ஆ' in Tamil means 'பசு (cow)' and 'பால்' means 'milk'. 'Aavin paal' ('ஆவின் பால்') translates to 'cow's milk' ('பசுவின் பால்').

In April 2020, Swiggy has partnered with Tamil Nadu Co-operative Milk Producers' Federation popularly known as 'AAVIN', to retail and sell its dairy and dairy products and as per this understanding Swiggy would make doorstep delivery of Aavin products across eight categories from 21 outlets across Chennai city. In July 2020, AAVIN in a new initiative, had invited drivers of autos and call taxis to work as its ‘mobile agents’ across Tamil Nadu, which it hopes will increase the sales of its milk products besides supporting the drivers in earning their livelihood, as currently they are struggling to make ends meet amid the COVID-19 lockdown. As per company reports for the year 2020, Aavin procures about 40 lakh litres of milk a day, of which 25 lakh litres are being sold as milk while the remaining is being converted into various milk products such as skimmed milk powder, ice creams, buttermilk, curd, ghee and butter. The company reported the annual turnover of  ₹5800 crore for 2019-20 and  monthly sales of milk increased from ₹34.78 crore to ₹41.15 crore.

Activities

The Tamil Nadu Co-operative Milk Producers' Federation Limited is an apex body of 17 District Cooperative Milk Producers' Unions and through procurement of milk from villagers helps in economic development of farming community and also facilitates the processing and manufacturing of various milk products.  It is headquartered located at Aavin Illam, Kumbakonam, Thanjavur District and has three dairy plants at the following locations in Thanjavur.
Thiruvidaimarudur - capacity of 4 LLPD
Thanjavur - capacity of 3 LLPD
Kumbakonam - capacity of 4 LLPD
These dairies collect milk from district unions, process and pack in sachets and send for sale to the consumers. Currently the organisation is purchasing 38 lakhs to 40 lakhs litre of milk per day and it has installed cloud based technology to monitor quality, quantity, pricing, and temperature control of the milk. The Ambattur product Dairy is engaged in the manufacture of milk products. The first Hi-Tech Aavin parlour in Coimbatore will open in March 2021.

In February 2021, Tamil Nadu chief minister Edappadi K Palaniswami  laid the foundation stone for two major Aavin plants to be constructed at Virudhunagar 

district. The Enjar village unit is being constructed at ₹70.15 crore and will fill high-temperature milk automatically in tetra packets and the daily average output at this unit will be around 25,000 tetra packs. The second plant in Srivalliputhur will produce milk products like yoghurt, curd, lassi, buttermilk and other probiotics. Both the plants are being financed by National Bank for Agriculture and Rural Development (NABARD).

In February 2021, Aavin has floated a tender to construct an ice cream plant with a capacity of 6,000 litres per day at the company's Kottapattu complex on the Trichy-Pudukkottai national highway and is proposed to be constructed at a cost of ₹43 crore under the Dairy Processing and Infrastructure Development Fund (DIDF) and  will also house a fermented dairy production unit with a capacity of 10,000 litres/day and allied infrastructure.

In September 2017, Aavin announced that it would be launching seven varieties of milk-based sweets for Deepavali.

Tamil Nadu Co-operative Milk Producers' Federation Limited entered into agreements with six vendors for sale of milk and milk products produced by it within India and export to United Arab Emirates, Ajman, Oman, Qatar, Canada and US and earn around ₹6 crores per year.

Controversies
In 2012, there were widespread rumors about the milk being adulterated when the milk was being transported from cooperative societies to dairies. In 2014, a major adulteration racket was busted by the police in Villupuram district. The modus operandi of the gang was to transfer cans of milk from transport that carries pure milk from Chennai to Tiruvannamalai and replace  it with equal quantity of water. Aavin said that it has encountered an estimated loss of  due to the racket.

Related Articles

Ministry of Fisheries, Animal Husbandry and Dairying

References

External links

 Official website

Companies based in Chennai
Dairy cooperatives in India
Dairy products companies of India
Indian brands
Ice cream brands
Dairy farming in India
Brand name dairy products
1958 establishments in Madras State
Indian companies established in 1958